The Ministry of Justice (MoJ) of Malawi provides legal advice and services to the government's ministries and departments, as well as the general public. The Ministry represents the government in civil litigation cases and prosecute criminal cases on behalf of the State, drafts legislation, and vets agreements and treaties on behalf of the government. The Ministry of Justice and Constitutional Affairs contains the following departments:

 The Attorney General’s Chambers
 Solicitor General's Chambers
 Directorate of Public Prosecutions
 Department of Registrar General
 Department of Administrator General

The ministry follows the direction of the Minister of Justice and Constitutional Affairs, and is under the supervision of the Solicitor General and Secretary for Justice. It was not uncommon for the Minister of Justice to serve simultaneously as the Attorney General. The current Minister of Justice is Titus Mvalo with Thabo Chakaka Nyirenda as the Attorney General.

List of ministers of justice (mainly post-independence in 1964) 

 Alan Munro (1957–1963)
 Orton Chirwa (1964) [1st Malawi-born Minister of Justice and Attorney General]
 Bryan C. Roberts (1965–1973) [Minister of Justice and Attorney General]
 H. Kamuzu Banda (1973–1991)
 Friday Makuta (1992–1993)
 Lovemore Munlo (1993–1994)
 Wehnam Nakanga (1994–1995)
 Collins Chizumira (1995–1996)
 Cassim Chilumpha (1996–1998)
 Peter H. Fachi (1999–2003)
 Henry Dama Phoya (2007–2008)
 Peter Mutharika (2009)
 George Chaponda (2010–2011)
 Ephraim Chiume (2011–2012)
 Ralph Kasambara (2012–2013)
 Samuel Tembenu(2014–2019)
 Bright Msaka(2019–2020)
 Titus Mvalo (2020–present)

See also 

 Justice ministry
 Politics of Malawi

References 

Justice ministries
Government of Malawi
Attorneys-General of Malawi